Almere Buiten is a district in the municipality of Almere in the Dutch province of Flevoland. The district houses 49,552 residents as of 2006.

Almere Buiten is made up of the following neighbourhoods: Bloemenbuurt, Bouwmeesterbuurt, Eilandenbuurt, Faunabuurt, Landgoederenbuurt, Molenbuurt, Oostvaardersbuurt, Regenboogbuurt, Stripheldenbuurt, Seizoenenbuurt, Indischebuurt and Sieradenbuurt. De Vaart, Buitenvaart and Poldervlak are industrial areas.

Almere Buiten also has three secondary schools, Oostvaarders College, Buitenhout College and Montessori Flevoland Lyceum. The Oostvaarders College won the national prize for education in 2007.

Buiten
Populated places in Flevoland
Populated places established in the 1970s